Streptomyces bacillaris is a bacterium species from the genus of Streptomyces which has been isolated from forest soil in Oregon in the United States.

See also 
 List of Streptomyces species

References

Further reading

External links
Type strain of Streptomyces bacillaris at BacDive -  the Bacterial Diversity Metadatabase

bacillaris
Bacteria described in 1970